Gisler is a surname. Notable people with the surname include:

Felix Gisler, Swiss para-alpine skier
Joel Gisler (born 1994), Swiss freestyle skier
Lisa Gisler (born 1994), Swiss curler
Marcel Gisler (born 1960), Swiss film director and screenwriter
Mike Gisler (born 1969), American football player
Rolf Gisler (born 1953), Swiss sprinter